The nuclear receptor coactivator 2 also known as NCoA-2 is a protein that in humans is encoded by the NCOA2 gene. NCoA-2 is also frequently called glucocorticoid receptor-interacting protein 1 (GRIP1), steroid receptor coactivator-2 (SRC-2), or transcriptional mediators/intermediary factor 2 (TIF2).

Function 

NCoA-2 is a transcriptional coregulatory protein that contains several nuclear receptor interacting domains and an intrinsic histone acetyltransferase activity.  NCOA2 is recruited to DNA promotion sites by ligand-activated nuclear receptors.  NCOA2 in turn acetylates histones, which makes downstream DNA more accessible to transcription.  Hence, NCOA2 assists nuclear receptors in the upregulation of DNA expression.

GRIP1 is a transcriptional co-activator of the glucocorticoid receptor and interferon regulatory factor 1 (IRF1).

Interactions 

Nuclear receptor coactivator 2 has been shown to interact with:

 AR, 
 ARNT, 
 BRCA1, 
 DDX17, 
 DDX5, 
 ESR1, 
 NR3C1, 
 PPFIA4, 
 PPARG, 
 RXRA,
 SRA1, and
 VDR.

References

Further reading

External links 
 
 
 
 

Transcription coregulators
PAS-domain-containing proteins